Defending champion Rafael Nadal won the men's singles tennis title at the 2014 Madrid Open after Kei Nishikori retired from the final due to a back injury, with the scoreline at 2–6, 6–4, 3–0. Nadal became the first man to defend the singles title at the Madrid Open since the tournament's inception in 2002.

Seeds
The top eight seeds receive a bye into the second round. 

 Rafael Nadal (champion)
 Novak Djokovic (withdrew, right arm injury)
 Stanislas Wawrinka (second round)
 Roger Federer (withdrew, personal reasons)
 David Ferrer (semifinals)
 Tomáš Berdych (quarterfinals)
 Andy Murray (third round)
 Milos Raonic (third round)
 John Isner (third round)
 Kei Nishikori (final, retired with a back injury)
 Jo-Wilfried Tsonga (second round)
 Grigor Dimitrov (third round)
 Fabio Fognini (first round)
 Tommy Haas (first round)
 Mikhail Youzhny (second round)
 Tommy Robredo (first round)

Draw

Finals

Top half

Section 1

Section 2

Bottom half

Section 3

Section 4

Qualifying

Seeds

 Santiago Giraldo (qualified)
 Julien Benneteau (first round)
 Teymuraz Gabashvili (qualified)
 Igor Sijsling (qualified)
 Andrey Golubev (qualified)
 Benjamin Becker (qualified)
 Marinko Matosevic (qualifying competition, Lucky loser)
 Dominic Thiem (qualified)
 Alejandro Falla (first round)
 Oleksandr Nedovyesov (first round, retired)
 Łukasz Kubot (qualifying competition, Lucky loser)
 Bernard Tomic (qualifying competition)
 Alejandro González (qualifying competition)
 Paul-Henri Mathieu (qualified)

Qualifiers

  Santiago Giraldo
  Paul-Henri Mathieu
  Teymuraz Gabashvili
  Igor Sijsling
  Andrey Golubev
  Benjamin Becker
  Dominic Thiem

Lucky losers

  Marinko Matosevic
  Łukasz Kubot

Qualifying draw

First qualifier

Second qualifier

Third qualifier

Fourth qualifier

Fifth qualifier

Sixth qualifier

Seventh qualifier

References

External links
 Main draw
 Qualifying draw

Men's Singles